Moj Mahdara, Iranian-American CEO of Beautycon Media, is an entrepreneur in the entertainment, digital, and emerging technology spaces. She has led three global agencies and launched a variety of consumer brands.

Moj served as the CEO of Exopolis, a digital interactive studio with a client list including Apple and Microsoft. Exopolis executed the “U2 Loves BlackBerry” campaign and had annual gross revenue of more than $30M.
 
Following Exopolis, Moj founded the agency, Made With Elastic, a Los Angeles-based agency for digital and consumer campaigns. MWE's investment roster includes Beautycon, Circa, Gobbler, Harry's, Hello Giggles, Zady.
 
Beautycon Media is a global community of content creators, celebrities, fans, and brands that discussfashion, beauty, style. Its main demographic is Gen Z and Millennials. The company operates through a variety of methods including Beautycon Festivals and Beautycon Box.
 
Beautycon Box was brought to market in 2016 and has partnered with multiple content and brand partners.
 
She was included in both Cosmopolitan and Marie Claire Magazine's “Top Female” Lists for 2015.

Awards and nominations

Personal life
She is married to screenwriter Roya Rastegar and they have a son.

References

Year of birth missing (living people)
Living people
American women chief executives
American chief executives
American LGBT businesspeople
21st-century American women